A dumper is an off-road vehicle designed for carrying bulk material.

Dumper may also refer to:

Surname
 James Dumper, English footballer
 Tony Dumper (1923-2012), English Bishop of Dudley

Other uses
 Dumper (computer program), a computer program that copies data from one source to another
 Dumper (Ender's Game), a character in the Ender's Game science fiction series
 Dump truck, a truck used for transporting loose material for construction
 Rotary car dumper, a mechanism used for unloading railroad cars
 Dumper (Gobots), a heroic fictional character.
 Skip (container), a large metal container for rubbish

See also

 Dump (disambiguation)
 Dumped
 Dumping (disambiguation)